Viegasella is a genus of fungi in the family Parmulariaceae. This is a monotypic genus, containing the single species Viegasella pulchella.

References

External links 

 Viegasella at Index Fungorum

Parmulariaceae
Monotypic Dothideomycetes genera